Slide Lake is located in Glacier National Park, in the U. S. state of Montana. Otatso Lake is situated north of Yellow Mountain along the Otatso Creek.

See also
List of lakes in Glacier County, Montana

References

Lakes of Glacier National Park (U.S.)
Lakes of Glacier County, Montana